John Abram Wayland (1849–1890) was the ninth President of the Chico Board of Trustees, the governing body of Chico, California from 1889 to 1890.

He was born in Missouri in 1849, the son of Dr. Joseph Franklin Wayland, and Emma S. R. McCullough Wayland. He came to Chico with his father, a prominent pharmacist.

References 

1849 births
1890 deaths
American pharmacists
California city council members
Mayors of Chico, California
American notaries
People from Missouri
19th-century American politicians